Eugnosta jequiena is a species of moth of the family Tortricidae. It is found in Brazil (Bahia).

The wingspan is about 11 mm. The ground colour of the forewings is white with a few pale brownish grey strigulae before the tornus followed by grey suffusion between the tornus and a black
spot at the end of the median cell. The hindwings are brownish with browner strigulation, but whiter at the base and in the radial part.

Etymology
The species name refers to the type locality.

References

Moths described in 2007
Eugnosta